Cruzeiro Esporte Clube, commonly known as Cruzeiro or Cabulosas, is a Brazilian women's Association football club, based in the city of Belo Horizonte, Minas Gerais, Brazil. The club won the  once.

History
On 27 February 2019, after CONMEBOL's demand that the male teams which would play in the 2019 Copa Libertadores needed to have an active women's team, Cruzeiro created their women's football section.

Players

Current squad

Honours
 :
 Winners (1): 2019
 Runners-up (3): 2020, 2021, 2022

References

External links
 

Cruzeiro Esporte Clube
Women's football clubs in Brazil
Association football clubs established in 2019
2019 establishments in Brazil